Ruslan Ramilyevich Salakhutdinov (born 1 April 1996) is a Russian football player.

Club career
He made his professional debut in the Russian Professional Football League for FC Tom-2 Tomsk on 19 July 2014 in a game against FC Yakutiya Yakutsk.

He made his Russian Premier League debut on 27 April 2017 in a game against FC Anzhi Makhachkala.

References

External links
 Career summary by sportbox.ru

1996 births
Living people
Russian footballers
Russian expatriate footballers
Association football midfielders
FC Tom Tomsk players
FC Krymteplytsia Molodizhne players
Russian Premier League players
Crimean Premier League players
Russian expatriate sportspeople in Armenia
Expatriate footballers in Armenia
FC Chayka Peschanokopskoye players